Frank-Volker Eichhorn (13 December 1947 – 17 January 1978) was a German composer.

Life 
Eichhorn studied mathematics and physics to become a teacher. He also worked as a teacher for two years, but began studying at the Hochschule für Musik "Hanns Eisler" on the side. He eventually gave up his teaching job as a maths and physics teacher and devoted himself entirely to music, becoming a  Meisterschüler of Günter Kochan at the Musikhochschule and a teacher of composition there.  He founded the concert series Kammerstudio at the Haus des Lehrers in Berlin. In 1975, he was awarded the Hanns Eisler Prize. In 1978, he received a first prize in the chamber music competition of the Dresden Music Festival. His compositions were published by Edition Peters and were performed among others by the orchestra of the Komische Oper Berlin and the MDR Leipzig Radio Symphony Orchestra. In January 1978, he was killed in a car accident at the age of 30. His grave is in the Waldfriedhof Kleinmachnow. His estate is kept in the Saxon State and University Library Dresden.

Work 
 Varianten für großes Orchester
 Novelle
 Porträt „Bildnis einer Frau“
 Reflexionen
 Anamorphosen für Flöte, Viola, Kontrabass und Schlagzeug
 Metaphorische Skizzen für Septett
 Doppelkonzert: Novelle
 Fantasie für Violoncello und streicherloses Orchester
 Konturen für Flöte, Oboe und Violine

Recording 
 1979: Varianten für großes Orchester (Nova) with the Leipzig Radio Symphony Orchestra conducted by Jochen Wehner

References

External links 
 
 
 Nachlass Frank-Volker Eichhorn in der Sächsische Landesbibliothek – Staats- und Universitätsbibliothek Dresden

20th-century German composers
20th-century classical composers
1947 births
1978 deaths